Krishnam Raju (1942-2022) was an Indian actor who acted in more than 190 films. Krishnam Raju entered Tollywood in 1966 with the film Chilaka Gorinka, directed by Kotayya Pratyagatma alongside Krishna Kumari. The film won the Nandi Award for Best Feature Film - Silver for that year. Later he acted in the mythological film Shri Krishnavataram, which also stars N. T. Rama Rao. He acted in many films with the established actors N. T. Rama Rao and Akkineni Nageswara Rao. He also acted in many films with the established actresses Krishna Kumari, Rajasulochana, Jamuna and Kanchana.

Krishnam Raju acted alongside Kanchana in Nenante Nene and later he acted in Bhale Abbayilu, the Telugu remake of Yash Chopra's 1965 film Waqt. Later he acted in films such as Buddhimantudu, Manushulu Marali, Mallee Pelli and Jai Jawan. He acted opposite Bollywood actress Rekha in Amma Kosam, which was her first film as an actress. Later he acted in films such as Anuradha, Bhagyavantudu and Bangaru Talli, the remake of critically acclaimed 1957 Hindi film Mother India. Later he acted in films such as Muhammad bin Tughluq portraying the role of Islamic scholar Ibn Battuta, Raj Mahal, Hantakulu Devaantakulu opposite Rajasulochana, Manavudu Danavudu opposite Krishna Kumari, Neeti Nijayitee opposite Kanchana and Vinta Dampatulu opposite Jamuna. Later he acted in films such as Badi Panthulu, Bala Mitrula Katha, Jeevana Tarangalu and Kanna Koduku. In most of the films he acted as antihero, villain and supporting roles and in lead roles in a few films.

Krishnam acted in Bantrotu Bharya, which marks the first collaboration of Krishnam Raju with Dasari Narayana Rao. Later he acted in the critically acclaimed film Krishnaveni opposite Vanisri, directed by V. Madhusudhana Rao. The film marks the debut of Krishnam Raju as a producer under his own production house Gopi Krishna Movies. Later he acted in Parivartana opposite Jamuna, Kanchana and Lakshmi and in Bharati opposite Jamuna, Iddaru Iddare and Yavvanam Katesindi. Later he acted in Bhakta Kannappa portraying the roles of Arjuna and Kannappa Nayanar directed by Bapu, which is the unique Telugu film to win the National Film Award for Best Audiography. Later he acted in Kurukshetram portraying the role of Karna, directed by Kamalakara Kameswara Rao. Later he acted in Amaradeepam, which marks the first collaboration of Krishnam Raju with K. Raghavendra Rao. The film earned him the Filmfare Best Actor Award (Telugu) and the Nandi Award for Best Actor for the year 1977. Later he acted in films such as Jeevana Teeralu, Manushulu Chesina Dongalu and Sati Savitri. Later he acted in Mana Voori Pandavulu, produced by him and Jaya Krishna. The film garnered the Filmfare Best Film Award (Telugu) for the year 1978 and Krishnam Raju shared the award with Jaya Krishna. Katakataala Rudraiah and Mana Voori Pandavulu were released within a gap of 10 days and both the films became blockbusters. Later he acted in films such as Ramabanam, Andadu Aagadu in which he acts in a role of a spy which is parallel to James Bond and the film became a smash hit. Later he acted in Rangoon Rowdy, Shri Vinayaka Vijayamu portraying the role of Lord Shiva. Later he acted in films such as Shivamettina Satyam, Kalyana Chakravarti and Alludu Pattina Bharatam, which was directed by K. Viswanath. Later he acted in Sita Ramulu, Bebbuli and Prema Tarangalu, the Telugu remake of 1978 Bollywood blockbuster Muqaddar Ka Sikandar. In 1981, he acted in Aadavaallu Meeku Joharlu directed by K. Balachander. In the same year he acted in Agni Poolu which was based on Yaddanapudi Sulochana Rani's novel of the same name. Later he acted in the musical hit, Puli Bidda, Taxi Driver, Ragile Jwala, Guvvala Janta, Rama Lakshmanulu, Madhura Swapnam, Talli Kodukula Anubandham, Nipputo Chelagaatam, Golconda Abbulu, Jaggu, Pralaya Rudrudu and critically acclaimed Trishulam. Later he acted in Nijam Chebite Nerama!, Adavi Simhalu, Puli Bebbuli, Kotikokkadu and Dharmaatmudu.

In 1984, Krishnam Raju acted in Yuddham, Sardar, Babulugaadi Debba, Kondaveeti Nagulu and S. P. Bhayankar. Later, he acted in the Tollywood industrial hit Bobbili Brahmanna, which earned him the Filmfare Best Actor Award (Telugu) and the Nandi Award for Best Actor. He also remade the film in Hindi as Dharm Adhikari with Dilip Kumar and Jeetendra in 1986. Later, he acted in films such as Raraju, Bharatamlo Shankaravam, Rowdy, Bandee, Tirugubatu, Aggi Raju, Bullet, Ukku Manishi, Ravana Brahma, Neti Yugadharmam and Ugra Narasimham. In 1986, he acted in Tandra Paparayudu portraying the role of Tandra Paparayudu which earned him Filmfare Best Actor Award for the year 1986. The film was premiered at the 11th International Film Festival of India. Later, he acted in films such as Brahma Nayudu, Sardar Dharmanna and Marana Shasanam which earned him Filmfare Best Actor Award for the year 1987. In 1987, he acted in Vishwanatha Nayakudu portraying the role of Srikrishnadevaraya. Later, he acted in films such as Maarana Homam, Kirai Dada, Maa Inti Maha Raju, Antima Teerpu, Prithvi Raj, Prachanda Bharatam, Dharma Teja, Prana Snehitulu, Simha Swapnam, Shri Ramachandrudu, Bhagawan, Two Town Rowdy, Yama Dharma Raju and Neti Siddhartha.

In 1991, Krishnam Raju acted in Vidhata, Bava Bavamaridi, Jailor Gaari Abbayi, Andaroo Andare, Gangmaster. In 1994, he acted in Palnati Pourusham which earned him Filmfare Best Actor Award (Telugu). Later he acted in Rikshaw Rudraiah, Simha Garjana, Nayudugaari Kutumbam, Tata Manavadu, Kutumba Gowravam and Maa Nannaki Pelli which won Nandi Award for Akkineni Award for Best Home-viewing Feature Film. In 1997, he entered Sandalwood and acted in two Kannada films viz Hai Bangalore and Simhada Mari. Later he acted in Sultan, Vanshoddharakudu and Neeku Nenu Naaku Nuvvu, which won Nandi Award for Akkineni Award for Best Home-viewing Feature Film. Later he acted in Raam and Billa, a film of the Don film series and acted with Prabhas for the first time.
Later he acted in Thakita Thakita and Rebel. Rebel marks the second innings of his production house, Gopi Krishna Movies. Krishnam Raju said in an interview that he would produce films continuously under the banner. Later he acted in Chandee and India's first 3D historical film, Rudramadevi, where he portrays the role of Ganapati Devudu, the father of Rudramadevi.

As an actor

As a producer

Notes

References

Filmography
Indian filmographies
Male actor filmographies